Shuddhi is a 2017 Indian Kannada-language crime-drama film written and directed by Adarsh Eshwarappa. The film mainly stars Nivedhitha, Lauren Spartano and Amrutha Karagada in the lead roles. It also stars Shashank Purushotham and Sidhaartha Maadhyamika in supporting roles.

Whilst the cinematography is by Andrew Aiello, the film score was composed by Jesse Clinton. The major portion of the film has been shot using handheld technique which is a rarity in Indian cinema. The sound designer of the film is Nithin Lukose; Shuddhi was one amongst the very few films in Kannada, which was shot in sync sound.

Plot
The plot of the film highlights the crimes against women faced in the society. Karlyn Smith is an American, who lands in the City of Bengaluru in India. She is on a secret mission, which we gradually discover more about, as we cruise along with her on a spiritual journey. Jyothi & Divya are two journalists of a weekly magazine, who alongside their profession, are fighting against the country's lenient Juvenile Justice Act. They form a team and put up street plays in an effort to generate funds and strengthen their protest with a nationwide tour. Rakesh Patil & Bharat Gowda from the state special crime branch office, along with a team are chasing a criminal and in the process, stumble upon a few mysterious killings.

The culmination of the three stories towards the end; gives a new dimension to the film as a whole and concludes Shuddhi.

Cast

 Lauren Spartano as Karyln Smith
 Nivedhitha as Jyothi
 Amrutha Karagada
 Shashank Purushottam
 Sidhartha Maadhyamika
 Ajay Raj as Vinay Muthappa
 Sanchari Vijay
 Vinay Krishnaswamy
 Kiran Vati
 Nagarjun Rajashekhar  as Pawan Rai

Release
The film's trailer was launched on 3 February 2017 and was well received. It trended on YouTube at number 3. Shuddhi released on 17 March 2017 and completed a 100-day theatrical run at Box Office. Shuddhi was screened in over 40 Locations Across North America and went on to become one of the first few Kannada Films to be chosen for Screenings by the Japanese Community in Bengaluru. The Film was bought by and is streaming on Netflix from March 2018. Writer & Director Adarsh Eshwarappa also went on to publish the full Screenplay of the Film online.

Reception
A review on Bangalore Mirror reads “The reel- and real- life inspired moments are blended together effortlessly, and synchronised sound recording, a trend that’s catching up in regional cinemas, adds a realistic touch to the movie" While Times of India review read 'To talk about the story and plot would be taking away credit from the good screenplay woven by the maker'. 'Shuddhi is a visceral cinematic experience, an absolute shock to the system' wrote Vikram Bondal from 'mad about moviez'

Awards

References

External links
 

2010s Kannada-language films
2017 crime drama films
2017 films
Indian feminist films
Films about rape in India
Films about social issues in India
Films about women in India